The 1997 WNBA Season was the Women's National Basketball Association's first in existence.  It started off with 8 franchises: Charlotte Sting, Cleveland Rockers, Houston Comets, Los Angeles Sparks, New York Liberty, Phoenix Mercury, Sacramento Monarchs, and the Utah Starzz.  It featured an inaugural game between the New York Liberty and the Los Angeles Sparks. The Sparks lost to the New York Liberty, 67–57. The attendance at the Forum was 14,284. The season ended with the Comets defeating the Liberty in a one-game series 65–51. Cynthia Cooper was named MVP of the game.

Regular season standings
Eastern Conference

Western Conference

Season award winners

League leaders
Chantel Tremitiere: Sacramento Monarchs, Minutes Played 1051
Cynthia Cooper: Houston Comets, Field Goals 191
Wendy Palmer: Utah Starzz, Field Goal Attempts, 420
Haixia Zheng: Los Angeles Sparks, Field Goal Percentage, .618
Cynthia Cooper: Houston Comets, 3-Pt Field Goals, 67
Ruthie Bolton: Sacramento Monarchs, 3-Pt Field Goal Attempts, 192
Eva Nemcova: Cleveland Rockers, 3-Pt Field Goal Percentage, .435
Cynthia Cooper: Houston Comets, Free Throws, 172
Cynthia Cooper: Houston Comets, Free Throw Attempts, 199
 Bridget Pettis: Phoenix Mercury, Free Throw Percentage, .898
Latasha Byears: Sacramento Monarchs, Offensive Rebounds, 87
Lisa Leslie: Los Angeles Sparks, Defensive Rebounds, 203
Lisa Leslie: Los Angeles Sparks, Total Rebounds, 266
Teresa Weatherspoon: New York Liberty, Assists, 172
Teresa Weatherspoon: New York Liberty, Steals, 85
Elena Baranova: Utah Starzz, Blocks, 63
Chantel Tremitiere: Sacramento Monarchs, Turnovers, 122
Isabelle Fijalkowski: Cleveland Rockers, Personal Fouls, 129
Cynthia Cooper: Houston Comets, Points, 621
Chantel Tremitiere: Sacramento Monarchs, Minutes per game, 37.5
Cynthia Cooper: Houston Comets, Points per game, 22.2
Lisa Leslie: Los Angeles Sparks, Rebounds per game, 9.5
Teresa Weatherspoon: New York Liberty, Assists per game, 6.1
Teresa Weatherspoon: New York Liberty, Steals per game, 3.0
Elena Baranova: Utah Starzz, Blocks per game, 2.2

Playoffs

There were only 8 teams in the league. For the playoffs, the four teams with the best record in the league were seeded one to four. Houston was in the Eastern Conference in 1997 so two Eastern Conference teams matched up in the WNBA Finals.

Coaches

Eastern Conference
Charlotte Sting: Marynell Meadors
Cleveland Rockers: Linda Hill-MacDonald
Houston Comets: Van Chancellor
New York Liberty: Nancy Darsch

Western Conference
Los Angeles Sparks: Linda Sharp
Phoenix Mercury: Cheryl Miller
Sacramento Monarchs: Mary Murphy and Heidi VanDerveer
Utah Starzz: Denise Taylor

References

External links
1997 WNBA Awards

 
1997
1997 in American women's basketball
1996–97 in American basketball by league
1997–98 in American basketball by league